Xiamen University Malaysia (abbreviated as XMUM) is a private university located in Bandar Sunsuria, Sepang, Selangor in Malaysia. It's the first overseas campus set up by a Chinese public university and the first Chinese university branch campus in Malaysia.

Upon the invitation of the Malaysian Ministry of Higher Education, Xiamen University (XMU) accepted the offer and thus, Malaysia Campus was established and officially opened in year 2016. It aspires to become a university with a distinct global outlook, featuring first-class teaching and research, and embracing cultural diversity. It enjoys the privileged support from Ministry of Education China for participation in "Project 211", "Project 985" and Double First-class initiative, which have been launched by the Chinese government to support selected universities in achieving world-class standing.

Xiamen University Malaysia offered undergraduate and postgraduate programmes taught in English. All the programmes are supported by strong faculty, about 30% of the teaching staff will be distinguished professors from XMU China, while the rest of the lecturers will be high quality talents recruited around the world, with at least 80% of faculty possessing PhD degrees. XMUM now has a student enrolment of over 6,000 students from 33 countries and regions.

Xiamen University Malaysia ranked 8th in Malaysia for Nature Index Institution Research Output.

History
Xiamen University was founded by the Malayan Chinese, Mr. Tan Kah Kee in 1921, is the first Chinese university to be founded by an overseas Chinese and is now well known as "Strength of the South" in China.

2012

In April, Malaysian government expressed its welcome to Chinese government for XMU to set up a campus in Malaysia.

2013

On January 21, the Malaysian Minister of Higher Education officially handed a letter to invite XMU to set up a campus in Malaysia.

On October 4, in the presence of General Secretary of the Chinese Communist Party, Xi Jinping and former Prime Minister of Malaysia, Dato' Sri Najib Razak, the agreement on providing all-round support for the construction of XMUM was signed.

2014

In July, former Prime Minister of Malaysia, Dato' Sri Najib Razak attended the commencement ceremony of the campus.

2015

On November 13, registration was approved by MOHE.

2015

On November 23, at the Malaysia-China High Level Economic Forum, Chinese Premier Li Keqiang said that the establishment of XMUM “not only demonstrates the depth of people-to-people exchange between China and Malaysia, but also the openness of the Malaysian government and its people”.

On December 3, XMUM officially opened for enquiries as well as for receiving applications after announcing the launch of the university's student recruitment.

2016

On February 22, the Malaysia Campus officially opened.

Academics 
Xiamen University Malaysia is a research university that pays equal attention to teaching and scientific research, from bachelor's to master's and doctoral degrees, it's committed to cultivating cross-cultural and international talents.

In combination with the advantages of Xiamen University, China, XMUM has a total of 22 undergraduate majors, 7 master's programs and 4 doctoral programs in the fields of Arts, business, science, engineering and Chinese medicine.

Rankings and reputation 

Xiamen University Malaysia has been listed among China's leading universities on the national 211 Project since year 1995, 985 Project since year 2000, and selected into the national Double First-class initiative since 2017, which have been launched by the Chinese government to support selected universities in achieving world-class standing.

According to The Times Higher Education World University Rankings 2022, XMU is ranked 23rd in China. In "2022 Best Global Universities Rankings" published by US News, XMU is ranked 43rd in Asia and 278th globally.       
       
All undergraduate programmes in Xiamen University Malaysia are Honours degree approved by Malaysian Ministry of Higher Education, and 17 out of 22 undergraduate programmes are "National First-Class undergraduate programmes" of China approved by Chinese Ministry of Education. All the programmes offered by Xiamen University Malaysia are recognised internationally, with dual accreditation by both the Malaysian government and Chinese government.

Xiamen University Malaysia also ranked 8th in Malaysia for Nature Index Institution Research Output

Faculties and schools 
Xiamen University Malaysia draws its strength from the excellent education resources offered by XMU, China. XMUM has a total of 7 schools for undergraduate and postgraduate, 1 school for pre-university, 1 MBA Center and 1 English Language Education Center.

School of Economics and Management 
School of Economics, Xiamen University (XMU), is the first school of economics ever established among the national key comprehensive universities in mainland China; School of Management, XMU, was granted accreditation by AMBA (2011), EQUIS (2013) and AACSB (2020), joining a prestigious group of 1% business schools worldwide which hold the “Triple Crown" accolade.  School of Economics and Management of the Malaysia Campus draws on and benefits from the excellent educational resources of both the School of Economics and the School of Management, XMU China.

School of Humanities and Communication 
Humanities College, XMU China, which consists of 9 research institutes and 15 research centres. The college publishes a number of high quality academic journals. It has been accorded the honour of being the “National Talents Training and Research Base for fundamental Studies in Humanities” and the “National Quality Courses” provider by China’ s Ministry of Education, and has evolved to become the torch-bearer in the provision of education in the fields of Chinese linguistics, literature, history and philosophical studies.

School of Energy and Chemical Engineering 
The School of Energy and Chemical Engineering, XMUM is supported by College of Energy, XMU China, one of China's top-rated new energy technology research institutions for education, R&D, and technology transfer. We are supported by a strong faculty team, consisting of high-calibre researchers and engineering experts in the fields of clean chemical energy, nuclear energy, solar and wind energy, bio energy, energy economics, and energy efficiency engineering, all dedicated to high quality R&D in energy science and technologies.

School of Electrical and Computer Engineering 
The School of Electrical and Computer Engineering, XMUM, is supported by the School of Information Science and Engineering, Software School, School of Informatics and School of Information Science and Technology, as well as the School of Aerospace Engineering of Xiamen University, China. The School of Information Science and Engineering are one of the oldest engineering schools in China with a comprehensive range of academic programmes, it owns an exemplary national educational centre for electronic information, and hosts the Ministry of Education's "Key Laboratory for Underwater Acoustic Communication and Marine Information Engineering". Software School are one of the 35 national exemplary software engineering schools approved by China's Ministry of Education and School of Informatics of Xiamen University China, which is ranked among the top ten in China and has a strong faculty in cyber security.

School of Traditional Chinese Medicine 
The Traditional Chinese Medicine programme at Xiamen University (XMU) was established in 1956. More than 20,000 graduates, who came from more than 50 countries and regions, have successfully completed the programme. The programme is supported by the Medical College at XMU and 7 affiliated tertiary hospitals (the highest level in the Chinese hospital classification).

School of Mathematics and Physics 
The School of Mathematics and Physics, XMUM draws on and benefits from the excellent educational resources of School of Mathematical Sciences, that was introduced in 1922, among the first batch of programmes at XMU China; and is supported by the College of Physical Science and technology, XMU China.

Physics department 
The physics department at Xiamen University Malaysia was founded in 2020, under the lineage and guidance of Xiamen University, China. It consists of  academics of diverse backgrounds and research expertise, ranging from quantum technologies, magnetic materials, photonics, computational physics, and theoretical physics. It's supported by the College of Physical Science and Technology in the main campus of Xiamen University in China. The college consists of the Department of Physics and the Department of Astronomy and the faculty members include academicians of the Chinese Academy of Science (adjunct), senior and junior experts holding prestigious titles. The research areas of the Department of Physics are diverse, focusing on various aspects of the frontiers, including condensed matter physics, statistical physics and biophysics, while featuring cross-disciplinary collaboration. The Department of Astronomy has strong collaborations with Shanghai Astronomical Observatory, Chinese Academy of Sciences.

China-ASEAN College of Marine Sciences 
Xiamen University (XMU) started marine studies almost 100 years ago and is recognized as the cradle of China's marine studies. Its Department of Oceanography, established in 1946, is the first of its kind in China, while its College of Ocean and Earth Sciences has developed into one of China's best marine research institutions with the state key discipline in Marine Science. Among the faculty, there are two academicians of the Chinese Academy of Sciences and a number of experts involved in “Thousand Talents Plan”, China's Recruitment Programme of Global Experts. The college also boasts excellent research platforms such as the State Key Laboratory of Marine Environmental Science, outstanding educational centers such as the National Experimental Center for Education, as well as an advanced general-purpose research vessel TKK (JIA GENG) equipped with state-of-the-art scientific instruments, which has been serving the interdisciplinary oceanographic cruises in international waters since 2016.

With strong support from XMU, China-ASEAN College of Marine Sciences (CAMS) developed as the first overseas college of marine sciences in Xiamen University Malaysia (XMUM), sponsored by the China-ASEAN Maritime Cooperation Fund provided by the Chinese Ministry of Foreign Affairs.

Research 
China-ASEAN College of Marine Sciences (CAMS) has built up laboratories and research facilities that allow for various marine science studies to be carried out. With a team of experienced researchers and laboratory staff, CAMS keeps a thriving research culture. A world's top scientific research vessel ‘‘Jiageng’’ of Xiamen University, were used by Xiamen University Malaysia for scientific research in Southeast Asian waters in the future to help Xiamen University to a higher level in marine scientific research and education. The research vessel has been officially included in the National Marine Survey fleet of China.

Faculty members from Xiamen University Malaysia (XMUM) have received Fundamental Research Grant Scheme (FRGS) awarded by the Malaysian Ministry of Higher Education (MoHE). To date, there are 28 research projects from 27 XMUM faculty members funded by the FRGS grant, some of the projects are from School of Mathematics and Physics, School of Energy and Chemical Engineering, School of Electrical Engineering and Artificial Intelligence, as well as School of Economics and Management.

Alibaba Cloud Partners with Xiamen University Malaysia to enhance the education and skills of the cloud computing staff and students. XMUM's cloud computing curriculum will provide students and staff with unparalleled access to resources put together by Alibaba Cloud's experts and will also allow them to host collaborative workshops and training activities. XMUM's staff and students can also join the Alibaba Cloud's Student Education Program, where upon completion they will receive a certification from Alibaba Cloud. Alibaba Cloud's team will play an advisory role at XMUM to ensure the content of the courses remains relevant and focused on the future needs of the industry, so students are well prepared for their careers. Besides, Huawei are also aiming to establish a joint teaching lab in Xiamen University Malaysia to transfer Huawei's latest ICT technologies the students.

The construction of Malaysia's largest radio telescope is in progress in Jelebu, Negeri Sembilan. University Malaya was currently in collaboration with the Shanghai Astronomical Observatory, Chinese Academy of Sciences and Xiamen University Malaysia to build the telescope. Malaysia has moved forward in the signing of a Memorandum of Agreement with the Shanghai Astronomical Observatory (SHAO) and Xiamen University Malaysia (XMUM) for the acquisition and operation of a VGOS radio telescope which will be expected to start its construction in Jelebu in the near future.

Student accommodation 

Xiamen University Malaysia provides on-campus accommodation to all registered students. Students are encouraged to live in campus residences, as living on campus fosters a spirit of cooperation and camaraderie that develops into lifelong friendships, and facilitates participation in extra-curricular activities through various cultural, recreational and social programmes.

Facilities of student accommodation including internet WI-FI connection in every room, an air-conditioner in every room, a common pantry on each floor equipped with a microwave oven, a refrigerator, a kettle and a water dispenser, a laundry room, a car parking area, a five-floor student activity centre beside the residences, including a canteen, a shop, a gym, a table tennis room, a gymnastics room, a martial arts room, a yoga room, a swimming pool, a lounge, prayer rooms, etc.

Campus facilities and resources 
Xiamen University Malaysia located near Kuala Lumpur International Airport and Putrajaya, the government administrative center of Malaysia. The campus covers 150 acres, with a floor area of 470,000 square meters, magnificent architecture, and a full range of facilities. The campus inherits the unique "Tan Kah Kee architectural style" in line with the three campuses of Xiamen University in China.

Smart campus 
Huawei work closely with Xiamen University Malaysia to innovate technology and launch further smart, safe, and green campus solutions, products, and services, to build a top-tier information infrastructure. Huawei Malaysia signed a memorandum of understanding (MoU) with Xiamen University Malaysia Campus, bringing its first Smart Campus to Malaysia after similar initiatives in emerging and developed markets including United Kingdom, America among others.

People's Great Hall 
People's Great Hall is the most iconic landmark of the campus. It is nine stories high with a total floor area of 36,000 square meters. It can house more than 1 million books and journals and contain over 2,000 seats. Equipped with various advanced facilities, including book stacks, exhibition areas, innovation/creative space, information/learning space, seminar rooms, and lecture halls, this building is able to accommodate the needs of study and research while providing comprehensive services for knowledge exchange.

Laboratory Center 
The Laboratory Center is a central department in Xiamen University Malaysia, which managing all the laboratories and research facilities within the campus. The main aim is to optimize the usage of research facilities among internal and external academicians. Currently, there are 7 divisions in Laboratory Center, namely:-

●   Chemistry

●   Marine Biotechnology

●   Chemical Engineering

●   Physics and New Energy Science & Engineering

●   Electrical & Electronics Engineering

●   Information & Communication Technology

●   Media & Journalism

Xiamen University Malaysia currently have 11 dedicated ICT labs with state-of-the-art equipment and industry-leading software. Additionally, with a total investment of RM17 million, six laboratories, including Microscopy Laboratory, General Chemistry Laboratory, Inorganic Chemistry Laboratory, Bioinformatics Laboratory, Cell and Molecular Biology Laboratory, Microbial Laboratory and Analytical Chemistry Laboratory, were officially put into use.

Other facilities include multimedia lecture halls, seminar rooms, tutorial rooms, multi-purpose student activity center with Olympic-sized swimming pool, gym, library, and labs.

See also 

 Xiamen University

References

External links 

2015 establishments in Malaysia
Private universities and colleges in Malaysia
Xiamen University